Mañalich is a surname. Notable people with the surname include:

Jaime Mañalich (born 1954), Chilean nephrologist and politician
Ramíro Mañalich (1887–?), Cuban fencer
Roberto Mañalich (1906–?), Cuban fencer